Leistomorpha brontoscopa is a moth of the family Oecophoridae. It is known from the Australian Capital Territory, New South Wales, Tasmania and Victoria.

The larvae feed on the dead leaves of Eucalyptus species, including Eucalyptus bicostata and Eucalyptus bridgesiana. They can be found in dead leaf litter.

References

Oecophorinae